Sociedad Deportiva Unión Club de El Astillero was a Spanish football club based in El Astillero, in the autonomous community of Cantabria. Founded in 1922, the club played for 23 seasons in Tercera División.

History

Founded in 1922 after the merger of three clubs in the city: Astillero FC, Selección and SIGVA, Unión Club ceased activities in 1936 due to the imminency of the Spanish Civil War, only returning in 1945. They first reached the Tercera División in 1960.

In the 1987–88 season, the club finished in the first position of their group, but gave up promotion to Segunda División B. In January 2021, the club was expelled from their group of the Segunda Regional, being unable to play in the 2021–22 season.

Season to season

23 seasons in Tercera División

References

External links
BDFutbol team profile

Football clubs in Cantabria
Association football clubs established in 1922
1922 establishments in Spain